Pavilonis is a Lithuanian surname
Algimantas Pavilonis
 (1932-2003), Lithuanian professor, lawyer, President of the Constitutional Court

Lithuanian-language surnames